Archery at the 1972 Summer Paralympics consisted of twelve events.

Medal table

Participating nations

Medal summary

References 

 

1972 Summer Paralympics events
1972
Paralympics